The Spitzmeilen is a mountain of the Glarus Alps, lying on the border between the Swiss cantons of Glarus and St. Gallen. It lies between the valleys of Schilstal and Sernftal.

References

External links

 Spitzmeilen on Hikr

Mountains of the Alps
Mountains of Switzerland
Mountains of the canton of St. Gallen
Mountains of the canton of Glarus
Glarus–St. Gallen border
Two-thousanders of Switzerland